Aiman is an Arabic language male name. It is an alternative Latin alphabet spelling of the name Ayman. It is derived from the Arabic Semitic root for right, and literally means righteous, he who is on the right, right-handed, blessed or lucky.

An early bearer of the name was Ayman ibn Ubayd, an early Muslim and sahabi of the Islamic prophet Muhammad.

It is a masculine name in the Arabic language. However, in Pakistan, due to a general lack of knowledge of Arabic, Ayman has been incorrectly appropriated to be used both as a masculine and feminine name. This may be because of the popular woman figure Umm Ayman, who raised Muhammad, whom parents incorrectly name their daughter after. However, her original name was Barakah, and Umm Ayman was her kunya, with "Umm" meaning mother of, and Ayman being the name of her eldest son, Ayman ibn Ubayd.

In Turkey, the name is spelled as Eymen. Eymen was the second most popular given name for boys born in the country in 2016, 2017, 2018 and 2019.

In Malaysia, Aiman was the 24th most popular name for male newborns in 2012.

Notable people with the name include:

Aiman Napoli, Italian footballer
Aiman Hakim Ridza, Malaysian actor and singer 
Aiman Witjaksono, Indonesian journalist and host of Aiman (TV program)
Aiman Al-Hagri, Yemeni footballer
Aiman Al Ziyoud, Jordanian television producer 
Fakrul Aiman Sidid, Malaysian footballer 
Aiman El-Shewy, Egyptian judoka
Prince Muhammad Aiman of Brunei, son of Prince Al-Muhtadee Billah, Crown Prince of Brunei
Aiman Abdallah, German-Egyptian TV presenter
Aiman Khwajah Sultan, Prince of Moghulistan

See also
Ayman

References

Arabic masculine given names